Dębinka  (German:Tzschecheln, 1937–1945 Eichenrode) is a village in the administrative district of Gmina Trzebiel, within Żary County, Lubusz Voivodeship, in western Poland, close to the German border.

Notable residents
 August Wilhelm Knobel (1807–1863), German Protestant theologian
 Horst Stechbarth (1925–2016), East German General

References

Villages in Żary County